Dominique Martin Dupuy (1767 – 21 October 1798) was a French revolutionary brigadier general.

The son of a baker from Toulouse, he engaged in the Régiment d'Artois before the French Revolution. In 1791, he was volunteer in the 1st battalion of the Haute-Garonne regiment, where he was soon elected junior lieutenant-colonel. He took part in the repression of royalist insurrections in Ardèche, then joined the Army of Italy, distinguishing himself at the battle of Lonato, where he commanded the 32nd Line Infantry Demi-brigade. Military governor of Milan in 1797, he accompanied Napoleon Bonaparte in the expedition to Egypt, where he wrote, shortly after Pope Pius VI's death : "We are fooling Egyptians with our pretended interest for their religion; neither Bonaparte nor we believe in this religion more than we did in Pius the Defunct's one". He was murdered during the Revolt of Cairo (1798). He had never ceased to correspond with the Jacobins from Toulouse.

Notes and references

1767 births
1798 deaths
Military personnel from Toulouse
Military leaders of the French Revolutionary Wars
French military personnel of the French Revolutionary Wars
French Republican military leaders of the French Revolutionary Wars